R'lyeh is a fictional lost city that was first mentioned in the H. P. Lovecraft short story "The Call of Cthulhu", first published in Weird Tales in February 1928. R'lyeh is a sunken city in the South Pacific and the prison of the entity called Cthulhu.

Description

Norwegian sailor Gustaf Johansen, the narrator of one of the tales in the short story, describes the accidental discovery of the city: "a coast-line of mingled mud, ooze, and weedy Cyclopean masonry which can be nothing less than the tangible substance of earth's supreme terror—the nightmare corpse-city of R'lyeh...loathsomely redolent of spheres and dimensions apart from ours". The short story also asserts the premise that while currently trapped in R'lyeh, Cthulhu will eventually return, with worshipers often repeating the phrase Ph'nglui mglw'nafh Cthulhu R'lyeh wgah'nagl fhtagn: "In his house at R'lyeh, dead Cthulhu waits dreaming".

Both locations are close to the Pacific pole of inaccessibility, the point in the ocean farthest from any land mass.

Significance and criticism 
R'lyeh is characterized by bizarre architecture likened to non-Euclidean geometry that hampers exploration and escape. At one point, a crew member "climbed interminably along the grotesque stone mouldingthat is, one would call it climbing if the thing was not after all horizontaland the men wondered how any door in the universe could be so vast" and at another, a sailor "was swallowed up by an angle of masonry which shouldn't have been there; an angle which was acute, but behaved as if it were obtuse". Mathematician Benjamin K.Tippett demonstrates that these observations are consistent with "exploring a bubble of curved spacetime". Non-Euclidean geometry and Einstein's theories feature in several of Lovecraft's stories as Weird elements. Critics Paul Halpern and Michael C. Labossiere note that Rather than having science expand its boundaries to include genuine supernatural phenomena through brand new theories, the alleged supernatural phenomena are instead accounted for in scientific terms through existing models of nature. Thus, science is not so much embracing the supernatural as reducing it to a manifestation of the natural. Lovecraft's fascinating approach to science and the supernatural is further illustrated by the fact that he reverses the usual technique for ghostly fright. Rather than breaking the laws of science with supernatural means and thus generating fear, he creates a feeling of horror by showing that the common sense views of physics and nature (that is, the old Newtonian views) are the comforting fantasy. In contrast, the counterintuitive "new physics", the true scientific reality, provides the source of horror.

Other interpretations
In Alan Moore's Lovecraft-derived comic book mini-series Neonomicon and Providence it is implied, in a fashion suiting a non-Euclidian entity such as Cthulhu, that R'lyeh and subsequently Cthulhu himself do not yet exist in a physical sense. R'lyeh and Cthulhu's "dead dreaming" are instead a metaphor for the fetal development of Cthulhu in the womb of a female human detective-turned-cultist, impregnated by a male Deep One while held prisoner by his followers. Similarly to the Antichrist, it is stated that Cthulhu's inevitable "return" to destroy civilization and liberate mankind from rule of law will begin with his physical birth.

Notes

References

 
 
  Definitive version.

External links
 "I, Cthulhu, or, What’s A Tentacle-Faced Thing Like Me Doing In A Sunken City Like This (Latitude 47° 9′ S, Longitude 126° 43′ W)?", Neil Gaiman (1986)
 A Colder War, Charles Stross (2000)

Cthulhu Mythos locations
Fictional islands
Fictional populated places
Fictional prisons
Fictional elements introduced in 1928